Andrea Martani (Manerbio, 25 October 1997) is an Italian rugby union player.
His usual position is as a Flanker and he currently plays for Calvisano in Top12.

References 

It's Rugby England Profile
ESPN Profile

1997 births
Living people
Sportspeople from the Province of Brescia
Italian rugby union players
Rugby union flankers